Amelie Fried (Ulm, 6 September 1958) is a German writer and television presenter. Her father, Kurt Fried, is the creator-publisher of Schwäbische Donauzeitung, nowadays a part of Südwest Presse. She studied journalism and film at university. She has worked extensively in television and has published numerous books.
Her 2008 book Schuhhaus Pallas. Wie meine Familie sich gegen die Nazis wehrte (Pallas Shoe Store. How My Family Fought Against the Nazis) deals with her family's persecution in Nazi Germany. The book received significant media attention and has been the subject of much debate.

Biography
After graduating from the Odenwald School in Heppenheim, Fried studied theater, journalism, art history, German studies, communication studies, ethnology, and Italian in Munich from 1976 to 1983. She then studied documentary film and television journalism until 1989 at the Munich University of Television and Film.

In 1984, Fried began to host television programs, including the 1984—1997 youth radio program Live aus dem Alabama (Live from Alabama), which dealt with topics such as AIDS, right-wing radicalism, drugs, and occultism. She also hosted the show 3 nach 9 between 1999 and 2009.

Fried has worked extensively as a writer. Until 2011, she wrote a regular column for the women's magazine Für Sie, and in 1995, she published her first children's book, Die StörenFrieds. Geschichten von Leo und Paulina (The Troublemakers. Stories from Leo and Paulina).

Fried is married to screenwriter Peter Probst, who has contributed to some of her publications.

Selected works

Adult literature
 Traumfrau mit Nebenwirkungen Hoffmann und Campe, Hamburg 1996; Goldmann, Munich 1998, 
 Am Anfang war der Seitensprung Novel. Hoffmann und Campe, Hamburg 1998; Heyne Verlag, Munich 2006, 
 Wann bitte findet das Leben statt? (editor) Rowohlt Verlag, Reinbek 1999; ibid. 2006, 
 Der Mann von nebenan Novel. Heyne, Munich 1999; ibid. 2006, 
 Geheime Leidenschaften und andere Geständnisse Heyne, Munich 2001, 
 Glücksspieler Novel. Heyne, Munich 2001; ibid. 2008, 
 Verborgene Laster und andere Geständnisse Heyne, Munich 2003, 
 Liebes Leid und Lust Novel. Heyne, Munich 2003; ibid. 2006, 
 Rosannas Tochter Novel. Heyne, Munich 2005; ibid. 2008, 
 Offene Geheimnisse und andere Enthüllungen Heyne, Munich 2006, 
 Die Findelfrau Novel. Heyne, Munich 2007; ibid. 2008, 
 Schuhhaus Pallas. Wie meine Familie sich gegen die Nazis wehrte with participation from Peter Probst. Carl Hanser Verlag, Munich 2008; expanded: dtv, Munich 2010, 
 Franz Josef und ich oder Liebe auf den zweiten Blick Sanssouci Verlag, Munich 2008, 
 Immer ist gerade jetzt Novel. Heyne, Munich 2009; ibid. 2010, 
 Eine windige Affäre Novel. Heyne, Munich 2011, 
 Wildes Leben. Späte Einsichten und verblüffende Aussichten Heyne, München 2011, 
 Verliebt, verlobt – verrückt. Warum alles gegen die Ehe spricht und noch mehr dafür Heyne, Munich 2012, 
 Traumfrau mit Lackschäden Novel. Heyne, Munich 2014, 
 Ich fühle was, was du nicht fühlst Novel. Heyne, Munich 2016,

Books for children and young adults
 Die StörenFrieds. Geschichten von Leo und Paulina. Illustrated by Jacky Gleich. Mosaik, Munich 1995; Goldmann, Munich 1999, 
 Neues von den Störenfrieds Illustrated by Jacky Gleich. Mosaik, Munich 1997; Goldmann, Munich 1999, 
 Hat Opa einen Anzug an? Illustrated by Jacky Gleich. Hanser, Munich 1997, 
 Der unsichtbare Vater Illustrated by Jacky Gleich. Hanser, Munich 1999, 
 Taco und Kaninchen (with Peter Probst). 6 Volumes, Munich 2003–2006
 Ich liebe dich wie Apfelmus. Die schönsten Gedichte für Kleine und Große (editor) Bertelsmann, Munich 2006, 
 Unsere Lieblingsgeschichten (editor) Omnibus, Munich 2007,

Newspaper articles
 Über die Odenwaldschule. Die rettende Hölle. in: FAZ, 14 June 2010.

Film adaptations
 Traumfrau mit Nebenwirkungen (1998)
 Am Anfang war der Seitensprung (1999)
 Am Anfang war die Eifersucht (2001)
 Der Mann von nebenan (2001)
 Liebes Leid und Lust (2006)
 Rosannas Tochter (2010)

Awards and recognition

 Grimme-Preis (1986)
 Telestar (1986)
 Bambi Award - for television hosting (1988)
 Deutscher Jugendliteraturpreis for Hat Opa einen Anzug an? (1998)
 Handprint on the Mall of Fame in Bremen (2009)
 Upper Bavarian Culture Award (2019)

References

External links

  Official website
 

1958 births
Living people
German television presenters
20th-century German women writers
21st-century German women writers
German children's writers
German women children's writers
German women television presenters
Radio Bremen people